Cyrille S. Oguin was Benin's ambassador to the United States of America. He has held this position from February 12, 2001, to May 8, 2014.

Education
He studied at the Algiers National School of Administration and the Graduate Institute of International and Development Studies.

References

Living people
Year of birth missing (living people)
Place of birth missing (living people)
Graduate Institute of International and Development Studies alumni
Ambassadors of Benin to the United States